Zhang Lanpei is a Chinese kickboxer.

As of December 2020 he was ranked #9 Bantamweight in the world by Combat Press.

Titles and accomplishments
Wu Lin Feng
 2020 Wu Lin Feng China -60 kg Champion

Kickboxing record

|-  style="background:#fbb;"
| 2022-03-26 || Loss || align=left| Ma Yunkang|| Wu Lin Feng 528 || Zhengzhou, China || Decision (Unanimous) ||3 ||3:00
|-
! style=background:white colspan=9 |
|-  style="background:#cfc;"
| 2021-12-16 || Win || align=left| Wei Weiyang ||Wu Lin Feng 526 || Zhengzhou, China || Decision (Split)  || 3 || 3:00
|-  style="background:#cfc;"
| 2021-05-29 || Win || align=left| Zhao Chongyang || Wu Lin Feng 2021: World Contender League 4th Stage || Zhengzhou, China || TKO (Punches)  || 2 || 2:02
|-  style="background:#fbb;"
| 2021-03-27 || Loss || align=left| Zhao Boshi || Wu Lin Feng 2021: World Contender League 1st Stage || China || Decision (Unanimous) ||3 ||3:00
|-  style="background:#fbb;"
| 2021-01-23 || Loss || align=left| Zhao Chongyang || Wu Lin Feng 2021: Global Kung Fu Festival || Macao, China || Decision (Unanimous)||3 || 3:00
|-  style="background:#cfc;"
| 2020-12-22|| Win||align=left| Yang Ming || Wu Lin Feng 2020: Women's 52kg Championship Tournament|| Zhengzhou, China || Decision|| 3 || 3:00
|-  style="background:#cfc;"
| 2020-11-14|| Win||align=left| Zhao Chongyang || Wu Lin Feng 2020: China 60kg Championship Tournament, Final  || Zhengzhou, China || KO (Punches & Knee)|| 1 || 2:05 
|-
! style=background:white colspan=9 |
|-  style="background:#cfc;"
| 2020-11-14|| Win||align=left| Zhao Boshi || Wu Lin Feng 2020: China 60kg Championship Tournament, Semi Final  || Zhengzhou, China || KO (Low Kick)|| 1 ||
|-  style="background:#cfc;"
| 2020-11-14|| Win||align=left| Xue Shenzheng || Wu Lin Feng 2020: China 60kg Championship Tournament, Quarter Final  || Zhengzhou, China || KO (Punches & Knee)|| 1 || 2:40
|-  style="background:#cfc;"
| 2020-08-29|| Win||align=left| Wang Junyu || Wu Lin Feng 2020: China New Kings Tournament Final || Zhengzhou, China || Decision|| 3 || 3:00
|-  style="background:#cfc;"
| 2020-07-05|| Win||align=left| Li Yuankun || Wu Lin Feng 2020: King's Super Cup 3rd Group Stage || Zhengzhou, China || Ext.R Decision|| 4 || 3:00
|-  style="background:#fbb;"
| 2020-06-13|| Loss||align=left| Zhang Jinhu || Wu Lin Feng 2020: King's Super Cup 2nd Group Stage || Zhengzhou, China || Decision||3 || 3:00
|-  style="background:#fbb;"
| 2020-05-15|| Loss ||align=left| Zhao Boshi || Wu Lin Feng 2020: King's Super Cup 1st Group Stage || Zhengzhou, China || Decision (Unanimous)||3 || 3:00
|-  style="background:#fbb;"
| 2019-09-06|| Loss||align=left| Chaophraya Petch Por.Tor.Aor || Wu Lin Feng 2019: WLF at Lumpinee - China vs Thailand || Bangkok, Thailand || Decision (Unanimous)||3 || 3:00
|-  style="background:#cfc;"
| 2019-05-04|| Win||align=left| Roman Minashan || Fight Time|| Xinyu, China || Decision (Unanimous)||3 || 3:00
|-  style="background:#fbb;"
| 2019-03-24|| Loss||align=left| Olsjan Mesoutaj || Wu Lin Feng 2019: WLF x Gods of War XII - China vs Greece || Athens, Greece || Decision ||3 || 3:00
|-  style="background:#cfc;"
| 2019-01-19|| Win||align=left| Yuki Miwa || Wu Lin Feng 2019: WLF World Cup 2018-2019 Final || Haikou, China || Decision (Unanimous)||3 || 3:00
|-  style="background:#cfc;"
| 2018-12-08|| Win ||align=left| Changnenlek || Wu Lin Feng 2018: WLF x S1 - China vs Thailand || Thailand ||Decision || 3||3:00
|-  style="background:#fbb;"
| 2018-11-07|| Loss ||align=left| Fabrício Andrade || Wu Lin Feng 2018: WLF x KF1 || Hong Kong || Decision || 3 || 3:00
|-  style="background:#cfc;"
| 2018-10-13|| Win ||align=left| Liam Gallagher || Wu Lin Feng 2018: China vs Canada || Canada || Decision (Unanimous)|| 3 || 3:00
|-  style="background:#cfc;"
| 2018-08-04|| Win ||align=left| Alexis Barateau || Wu Lin Feng 2018: WLF -67kg World Cup 2018-2019 2nd Round || Zhengzhou, China || KO (Body Kick)|| 1 || 0:30
|-  style="background:#cfc;"
| 2018-06-02|| Win||align=left| Zhu Rui ||Wu Lin Feng New Generation || Zhong County, China || KO (Left Hook to the body)||  ||
|-  style="background:#cfc;"
| 2016-10-14|| Win ||align=left| Chenchai || Wu Lin Feng x KF1 || Hong Kong || Decision (Unanimous)|| 3 || 3:00
|-
| colspan=9 | Legend''':

References 

Chinese male kickboxers
1998 births
Living people